Music Row II is the second cover album by Jill Johnson, recorded in Nashville and released on 28 October 2009, two years after Music Row.

Track listing

Charts

References

External links

2009 albums
Covers albums
Jill Johnson albums